Umr-e-Lahaasil Ka Haasil  is a collection of a poetry and prose book. It is authored by Haider Qureshi a Pakistani poet, writer and journalist. The book comprises four published poetry books, titled ' Sulgate Khwaab, Umr-e-Guraizan, Muhabbat Kei Phool, Dua-e-Dil and fifth unpublished poetry book, ' Dard Samunder. In prose comprises these books, 'Roshni Ki Basharat, Qissay Kahanian, Meri Muhabbatein, Soo-e-Hijaaz, Khati Meethi Yaadein and one collection on Inshiye 'Faasiley Qurbatein.

Summary

Haider Qureshi's poetry is basically on the theme of love and affection but his some nazms are on different topics, as like on corrent issues of the globe, history and mythologies. Qureshi has also written heart touching Mahiyas, a form of the Urdu poetry.

In prose, the second part of the book, Qureshi expresses his emotions, views and feelings. His work of prose and poetry is based on the universe, human being, God, soul and cultures. In his short stories, he speaks about the oil-driven wars imposed by western world and rich and poor. He has also written his impressions in his autobiography.
 
Qureshi's literary work one can easily admire and praise.

Expression

Qureshi has expressed and recalled, in many poems, articles and short stories, his memories of old days in Pakistan.
He has also written his views about poets and writers like Faiz Ahmad Faiz, Dr Wazir Agha, Mirza Adeeb, Ghulam Jeelani Asghar and Azra Asghar.

References

External links
 Complete Books with the additional writings in PDF
 Umre La Hasil Ka Hasil
 Akbar Hamidis Article on Kuliyat

Urdu-language poetry
Pakistani literature